The lawn bowls competition at the 1938 British Empire Games took place in Waverley, Sydney, from 7 to 9 February 1938.

Horace Harvey won the singles going undefeated, New Zealand won the pairs and fours (the latter after a gold medal play off).

Medal table

Medallists
All events were for men only.

Men's singles – round robin

Results

Men's pairs – round robin

Results

+ Hutton & Mildren defeated Adamson & Appleford 13–12 in a play off to win the silver medal

Men's rinks (fours) – round robin

Results

 + New Zealand defeated South Africa 19–16 in a play off to win the gold medal
 ++ Australia defeated Canada 30–10 in a play off to win the bronze medal

References

See also
List of Commonwealth Games medallists in lawn bowls
Lawn bowls at the Commonwealth Games

Lawn bowls at the Commonwealth Games
Brit